Baku Eurasian University, is a private university located in Baku, Azerbaijan.

Affiliations
The university is a member of the Caucasus University Association.

References

External links 
Baku Eurasian University website

Universities in Baku
Education in Baku
Educational institutions established in 1992
1992 establishments in Azerbaijan